Local elections were held in Norway on 9 September 2019. Voters elected representatives to municipal and county councils, which are responsible for education, public transport, health, and elderly care, and for the levy of certain taxes.

The local election was the first since the consolidation of municipalities and counties, reducing the number of counties from 19 to 11, and number of municipalities from 429 to 356. Despite the formal date of the mergers being 1 January 2020, the election proceeded with the new borders and divisions as the term of office began the same day.

The political parties in four municipalities in Finnmark county (Alta, Karasjok, Kautokeino, and Loppa) cancelled all their campaigning following a helicopter crash in Alta on 31 August.

Results

Municipality results 
The table below shows the results for the 20 most populous municipalities.

All municipalities

Opinion polls

National

Municipal elections

By municipality 
In case of the merger of municipalities, the 2015 results listed are those for the municipality of that name in 2015.

Oslo

Bergen

Trondheim

Stavanger

Bærum

Kristiansand

Fredrikstad

Sandnes

Tromsø

Drammen

Sandefjord

Asker

Nordre Follo

Sarpsborg

Skien

Bodø

Ålesund

Larvik

Tønsberg

Arendal

Indre Østfold

Karmøy

Ullensaker

Haugesund

Porsgrunn

Ringsaker

Moss

Lillestrøm

By county 
In case of the merger of counties, the 2015 results listed are the sum total of the results for each party's electoral lists in the original counties in 2015.

Agder 
Agder consists of the former counties of Aust-Agder and Vest-Agder.

Innlandet 
Innlandet consists of the former counties of Hedmark and Oppland.

Møre og Romsdal

Nordland

Rogaland

Troms og Finnmark 
Troms og Finnmark consists of the former counties of Troms and Finnmark.

Trøndelag 
Trøndelag consists of the former counties of Sør-Trøndelag and Nord-Trøndelag.

Vestfold og Telemark 
Vestfold og Telemark consists of the former counties of Vestfold and Telemark.

Vestland 
Vestland consists of the former counties of Hordaland and Sogn og Fjordane.

Viken 
Viken consists of the former counties of Buskerud, Akershus, and Østfold.

References

External links 
List of polls by municipality on pollofpolls.no 
List of polls by county on pollofpolls.no 

Local elections in Norway
2010s elections in Norway
Norway
2019 in Norway
September 2019 events in Europe